Four flats may refer to:
A-flat major, a major musical key with four flats
F minor, a minor musical key with four flats
Flat-four engine, a type of piston engine